Miss Teen USA 2015 was the 33rd Miss Teen USA pageant. It was held at the Atlantis Paradise Island in Nassau, The Bahamas on August 22, 2015 and was hosted by Miss USA 2013 Erin Brady and television writer Nick Teplitz. All fifty states and District of Columbia competed. K. Lee Graham of South Carolina crowned her successor Katherine Haik of Louisiana at the end of the event.

Results

Special Awards

Historical significance 
 Louisiana wins competition for the second time.
 California earns the 1st runner-up position for the second time. The last time it was placed in 2002.
 North Carolina earns the 2nd runner-up position for the third time. The last time it was placed in 2008.
 Tennessee earns the 3rd runner-up position for the first time.
 Massachusetts earns the 4th runner-up position for the first time.
 States that placed in semifinals the previous year were Arizona, California, Massachusetts, Oklahoma, Pennsylvania, South Carolina, Tennessee and Texas.
 South Carolina placed for the fifth consecutive year. 
 California and Tennessee placed for the third consecutive year. 
 Arizona, Massachusetts, Oklahoma, Pennsylvania and Texas made their second consecutive placement.
 Alabama, Arkansas, Louisiana, Missouri and New York last placed in 2013.
 North Carolina last placed in 2012.
 Vermont last placed in 1993.
 West Virginia breaks an ongoing streak of placements since 2011.
 New Jersey and Wisconsin break an ongoing streak of placements since 2013.

Order of announcement

Top 15

Top 5

Pageant

Selection of contestants
One delegate from each state and the District of Columbia will be chosen in state pageants held from September 2014 to January 2015.

Preliminary round
Prior to the final telecast, the delegates compete in the preliminary competition, which involves private interviews with the judges and a presentation show where they compete in swimsuit and evening gown. It will be held on August 21, 2015 and broadcast on the Miss Teen USA website.

Finals
During the final competition, the top fifteen competed in swimsuit and evening gown, and the top five competed in the final question signed up by a panel of judges. The winner of the pageant will get to wear the new crown made by Diamonds International Corporation, a Czech-based jeweller, the newest official jewelry maker of Miss Teen USA.

Judges
BJ Coleman
Danielle Doty - Miss Teen USA 2011 from Texas
Fred Nelson
Marc Passera
Rachel Frimer
Tony Capasso

Contestants
51 delegates participated:

1 As at 22 August 2015

References

External links
 Miss Teen USA official website

Teen USA
2015
2015 in the Bahamas